SlideRocket was an online presentation platform that lets users create, manage, share and measure presentations. SlideRocket is provided via a SaaS model. The company was acquired by VMware in April 2011, who sold it to ClearSlide, a similar SaaS application, in March 2013. They are no longer offering independent signups, as the platform is being integrated into ClearSlide.

History
SlideRocket was founded in Jan 2006,  and launched as a private beta in March 2008 at the Under The Radar Spring event. A public beta was announced in September 2008 followed shortly by public release on October 28, 2008. SlideRocket is most commonly credited with inventing the PResuMÉ or Presentation Résumé in early 2009.

On April 26, 2011, SlideRocket was acquired by VMware. On March 5, 2013, VMware sold SlideRocket to ClearSlide.
SlideRocket is based in San Francisco.

Awards
 Underneath the Radar Spring 2008, Category Winner, Audience Choice, Judges Choice.
 Crunchies 2008 — Nominee Best Design

See also
Presentation
Presentation Software
Communication Design
Rich Internet application
SaaS

References

External links 
 Official site
 Official blog
 An Interview with Chuck Dietrich, CEO, SlideRocket

Web software
Web applications
Rich web applications
Cloud applications
Cloud storage
Presentation software
VMware